Deyvid Franck Silva Sacconi or simply Deyvid Sacconi (born April 10, 1987 in Alfenas), is a Brazilian attacking midfielder. Due to his Italian ancestry he holds an Italian passport.

Career
In August 2013, Sacconi signed a one-year contract with Khazar Lankaran in the Azerbaijan Premier League.

In September 2014, Sacconi signed for ABC Futebol Clube in the Campeonato Brasileiro Série B.

Club statistics

1Includes Emperor's Cup.
2Includes J.League Cup and Azerbaijan Supercup.
3Includes Copa Sudamericana.

Honours
 Palmeiras
São Paulo State League (1) - 2008
 Khazar Lankaran
 Azerbaijan Supercup (1) - 2013

References

External links

 sambafoot
 CBF
 ultimosegundo
 clicbrasilia
 yahoo
 globoesporte
 lancenet
 terra.com
 palmeiras.gobo.com

1987 births
Living people
Brazilian footballers
Brazilian expatriate footballers
Campeonato Brasileiro Série A players
Campeonato Brasileiro Série B players
J1 League players
Azerbaijan Premier League players
K League 2 players
Persian Gulf Pro League players
Guarani FC players
Sociedade Esportiva Palmeiras players
Goiás Esporte Clube players
Grêmio Barueri Futebol players
Clube Náutico Capibaribe players
Clube Atlético Bragantino players
ABC Futebol Clube players
Vegalta Sendai players
Khazar Lankaran FK players
Clube Atlético Sorocaba players
Luverdense Esporte Clube players
Daegu FC players
Esteghlal Khuzestan F.C. players
Associação Desportiva São Caetano players
Grêmio Esportivo Brasil players
Brasiliense Futebol Clube players
Brazilian people of Italian descent
Expatriate footballers in Japan
Brazilian expatriate sportspeople in Japan
Expatriate footballers in Azerbaijan
Brazilian expatriate sportspeople in Azerbaijan
Expatriate footballers in South Korea
Brazilian expatriate sportspeople in South Korea
Expatriate footballers in Iran
Brazilian expatriate sportspeople in Iran
Association football midfielders